Female bodybuilding is the female component of competitive bodybuilding.  It began in the late 1970s, when women began to take part in bodybuilding competitions.

History

Origins
Female bodybuilding originally developed as an outgrowth of not only the late nineteenth-century European vaudeville and circus strongwomen acts, Bernarr Macfadden's turn of the century women's physique competitions, and the weightlifting of Abbye "Pudgy" Stockton, but also as an outgrowth of the men's bodybuilding. The contest formats of men's events during the 1950s to the mid-1970s had often been supplemented with either a women's beauty contest or bikini show. These shows "had little to do with women's bodybuilding as we know it today, but they did serve as beginning or, perhaps more properly, as a doormat for the development of future bodybuilding shows." Physique contests for women date back to at least the 1960s with contests like Miss Physique, Miss Body Beautiful U.S.A., W.B.B.G. and Miss Americana, I.F.B.B. Maria Elena Alberici, as listed in the Almanac of Women's Bodybuilding, won two national titles in one year: Miss Body Beautiful U.S.A. in 1972, promoted by Dan Lourie and Miss Americana in 1972, promoted by Joe Weider. Mr. Olympia, Arnold Schwarzenegger was a judge at the Brooklyn Academy of Music in New York when Maria Elena Alberici (aka) Maria Lauren won Miss Americana. It was not until the late 1970s, after the advent of the feminist movement and female powerlifting events that women were seen as capable of competing in their own bodybuilding competitions.

1977–1979

Prior to 1977, bodybuilding had been considered strictly a male-oriented sport. Henry McGhee, described as the "primary architect of competitive female bodybuilding", was an employee of the Downtown Canton YMCA, carried a strong belief that women should share the opportunity to display their physiques and the results of their weight training the way men had done for years. The first official female bodybuilding competition was held in Canton, Ohio, in November 1977 and was called the Ohio Regional Women's Physique Championship. It was judged strictly as a bodybuilding contest and was the first event of its kind for women. Gina LaSpina, the champion, is considered the first recognized winner of a woman's bodybuilding contest. The event organizer, McGhee, told the competitors that they would be judged "like the men," with emphasis on muscular development, symmetry, and physique presentation. In 1978, McGhee organized the first National Women's Physique Championship, along with the short-lived United States Women's Physique Association (USWPA), which he formed to help organize women interested in competing in bodybuilding. The USWPA became defunct in 1980.

On August 18, 1979, promoter George Snyder organized a "female bodybuilding" contest known as The Best in the World contest, which was the first IFBB-sanctioned event for women that awarded prize money to the top finishers, with the winner receiving $2,500. It was considered the forerunner for the Ms. Olympia competition. Although sanctioned as a bodybuilding contest, women were required to appear on stage in high heels. Doris Barrilleaux found the Superior Physique Association (SPA) in 1978, the first women's bodybuilding organization run for women and by women. She also began publishing the SPA News, a newsletter dedicated exclusively to female bodybuilding. SPA disseminated information to women about contests and proper training and dieting. On April 29, 1979, SPA held Florida's first official women's contest in which thirteen women competed. The contest was held in Brandon Florida and promoted by Megas Gym and Doris Barrilleaux. The winner of the show was Laura Combes.  Also in 1979, the IFBB formed the IFBB Women's Committee; Christine Zane was appointed the first chairperson to serve as head of the newly formed committee. One of the significant differences between the SPA and the IFBB was that while the IFBB was organized and run by men, the SPA was run by women and for women.

More contests started to appear in 1979. Some of these were the following:

The second U.S. Women's National Physique Championship, won by Kay Baxter, with Marilyn Schriner second and Cammie Lusko third.
The first IFBB Women's World Body Building Championship, held on June 16, won by Lisa Lyon, followed by Claudia Wilbourn, Stella Martinez, Stacey Bentley, and Bette Brown.
The Best In The World contest, held at Warminster, Pennsylvania on August 18, featuring a $5,000 prize fund, with $2,500 awarded for first place. Patsy Chapman was the winner, followed by April Nicotra, Bentley, Brown, and Carla Dunlap. (Levin, 1980)
The Robby Robinson Classic, held at the Embassy Auditorium in Los Angeles on August 25. Bentley finished first, also winning best legs and best poser, followed by Brown, Lusko, and Georgia Miller. (Roark, 2005)

Although these early events were regarded as bodybuilding contests, the women wore high-heeled shoes, and did not clench their fists while posing.  Additionally, they were not allowed to use the three so-called "men's poses" — the double biceps, crab, and lat spread.  The contests were generally held by promoters acting independently; the sport still lacked a governing body.  That would change in 1980.

1980–1989

The 1980s is when female bodybuilding first took off. The early 1980s signified a transition from the fashionably thin "twiggy" body to one carrying slightly more muscle mass. The National Physique Committee (NPC) held the first women's Nationals in 1980.  Since its inception, this has been the top amateur level competition for women in the US. Laura Combes won the inaugural contest. The first World Couples Championship was held in Atlantic City, New Jersey on April 8. The winning couple was Stacey Bentley and Chris Dickerson, with April Nicotra and Robby Robinson in second. Bentley picked up her third consecutive victory in the Frank Zane Invitational on June 28, ahead of Rachel McLish, Lynn Conkwright, Suzy Green, Patsy Chapman, and Georgia Miller Fudge.

In 1980, the first Ms. Olympia (initially known as the "Miss" Olympia), the most prestigious contest for professional female bodybuilders, was held. Initially, the contest was promoted by George Snyder.  The contestants had to send in resumes and pictures, and were hand-picked by Snyder based on their potential to be fitness role models for the average American woman. The first winner was Rachel McLish, who had also won the NPC's USA Championship earlier in the year. The contest was a major turning point for the sport of women's bodybuilding. McLish turned out to be very promotable, and inspired many future competitors to start training and competing. Stacey Bentley finished in fifth place, in what turned out to be her final competition. Also in 1980, the American Federation of Women Bodybuilders was also founded, representing a growing awareness of women bodybuilders in America.  Winning competitors such as Laurie Stark (Ms. Southern States, 1988) helped to popularize the federation.

Rachel McLish became the most successful competitor of the early 1980s.  She lost her Ms. Olympia crown by finishing second to Kike Elomaa in 1981, but regained the title in 1982.  A new major pro contest, the Women's Pro World Championship, was held for the first time in 1981 (won by Lynn Conkwright). Held annually through 1989, this was the second most prestigious contest of the time. McLish added this title to her collection in 1982.  George Snyder lost the rights to the Ms. Olympia in 1982, and after this the contestants were no longer hand-picked, but instead qualified for the Ms. Olympia through placings in lesser contests. Women's bodybuilding was officially recognized as a sport discipline by the 1982 IFBB Congress in Bruges, Belgium.

As the sport grew, the competitors' level of training gradually increased as did the use of anabolic steroids (most of the competitors in the earliest shows had very little weight training experience or steroid usage), and the sport slowly evolved towards more muscular physiques.  This trend started to emerge in 1983. With McLish not competing in the big shows, Carla Dunlap took both the Pro World and Ms. Olympia titles. Dunlap possessed a more muscular physique than either McLish or Elomaa, and though she never repeated her successes of 1983, she would remain competitive for the rest of the decade.

In 1984, a new force emerged in women's bodybuilding. Cory Everson won the NPC Nationals, then defeated McLish to win the Ms. Olympia.  At 5'9" and 150 pounds, Everson's physique set a new standard. She would go on to win six consecutive Ms. Olympia titles from 1984 to 1989 before retiring undefeated as a professional, the only female bodybuilder ever to accomplish this.

During this period, women's bodybuilding was starting to achieve some serious mainstream exposure. Lori Bowen, winner of the 1984 Pro World Championship, appeared in a widely broadcast commercial for Miller Lite beer with Rodney Dangerfield.  Additionally, competitors Lynn Conkwright (1982) and Carla Dunlap (1984) were included in ABC's Superstars competition.

In 1985, a movie called Pumping Iron II: The Women was released.  This film documented the preparation of several women for the 1983 Caesars Palace World Cup Championship. Competitors prominently featured in the film were Kris Alexander, Lori Bowen, Lydia Cheng, Carla Dunlap, Bev Francis, and Rachel McLish. At the time, Francis was actually a powerlifter, though she soon made a successful transition to bodybuilding, becoming one of the leading competitors of the late 1980s and early 1990s. The main theme of the movie pitted the sultry and curvaceous Rachel McLish, the current champion; against the super-muscular Bev Francis. This "rivalry" brought to light the true dilemma of Women's Bodybuilding and exposed the root of all the controversy (aesthetics vs size) which was the focal point at that time and which still continues today. In 1985, the National Women's and Mixed Pairs Bodybuilding Championships were held in Detroit, Michigan by promoter/bodybuilder Gema Wheeler (Long). It was the first amateur bodybuilding event televised internationally by ESPN Sports.

For several years in the mid-1980s, NBC broadcast coverage of the Ms. Olympia contest on their Sportsworld program.  The taped footage was telecast months after the contest, and was usually used as secondary material to fill out programs featuring events such as boxing.  Typically, the broadcasts included only the top several women.  Nevertheless, Rachel McLish and some of her leading competitors were receiving national TV coverage. McLish authored two New York Times best-selling books - "Flex Appeal" (1984) and "Perfect Parts" (1987) – and was also starring in action films. The popularity was growing and women were being empowered and inspired to train. In 1983, the top prize money for the women bodybuilding was $50,000, equal to that of male bodybuilding.

The Ms. International contest was introduced in 1986, first won by Erika Geisen. In 1987 the Amateur Athletic Union (AAU), who were sanctioning amateur bodybuilding at the time, positioned the International as a premiere amateur event.  It was held in Atlantic City, New Jersey.  The AAU brought Serge Nubret (a former Mr. World, Mr. Universe and Mr. Europe) from France to be the featured guest poser. Since 1988, the competition has been sanctioned by the IFBB.  Since the demise of the Pro World Championship after 1989, the Ms. International has been second in prestige only to the Ms. Olympia.  The 1989 Ms. International was noteworthy for the fact that the original winner, Tonya Knight, was later disqualified for using a surrogate for her drug test at the 1988 Ms. Olympia contest. Consequently, runner-up Jackie Paisley received the 1989 title.  Knight was suspended from IFBB competition through the end of 1990, and was forced to return her prize money from the 1988 Ms. Olympia and 1989 Ms. International, a total of $12,000 (Merritt, 2006).

1990–1999

Normally, competitors must qualify for the Ms. Olympia by achieving certain placings in lesser pro contests.  However, the cancellation of the Women's Pro World contest in 1990 left only the Ms. International as a Ms. Olympia qualifier.  Consequently, the IFBB decided to open the Ms. Olympia to all women with pro cards, and a field of thirty competitors entered.  Lenda Murray, a new pro from Michigan, earned a decisive victory and emerged as the successor to Cory Everson.  Murray became the next dominant figure in the sport.

A new professional contest, the Jan Tana Classic, was introduced in 1991.  The contest was named for its promoter, a marketer of tanning products, and ran annually until 2003 with the departure of Wayne Demilia (it was later briefly revived in 2007).  The inaugural event was won by Sue Gafner.  The Jan Tana filled the void left by the Women's Pro World contest, and occupied the number three slot on the pro circuit throughout its lifetime.  1991 also saw Tonya Knight return to competition, winning the Ms. International.

The 1991 Ms. Olympia contest was the first to be televised live.  Lenda Murray faced a serious challenge from the 1990 runner-up, Bev Francis.  Francis had started bodybuilding in the mid-1980s, converting over from powerlifting.  Over the years, she had gradually refined her physique to be more in line with judging standards.  However, she came to the 1991 contest noticeably larger than in previous years.  Francis was leading going into the night show, with Murray needing all of the first place votes to retain her title.  Murray managed to do just that, winning a somewhat controversial decision by one point.

In 1992, there was more controversy, this time at the 1992 Ms. International contest.  In response to the increased size displayed by Murray and Francis at the previous Ms. Olympia, along with increasing drug abuse and androgenic side effects, the IFBB made an attempt to "feminize" the sport. The IFBB, led by Ben Weider, had created a series of "femininity" rules; one line in the judging rules said that competitors should not be "too big." Since extreme size generally requires extreme AAS usage, with more women gaining more androgenic (masculine) side effects, this was clearly an attempt to retain a higher level of female aesthetics and maintain the standard.  The judges’ guide to the competitors stated that they were looking for a highly feminine and optimally developed, but not emaciated physique.  The contest winner was Germany's Anja Schreiner, a blue-eyed blonde with a symmetrical physique who weighed 130 pounds at 5'7".  The announcement of her victory met with so much booing from those who prefer size over aesthetics that Arnold Schwarzenegger had to step on stage to address the audience, saying "the hell with the judges".  Many observers felt that the IFBB had instructed the judges to select the most marketable aesthetic physique, not the most muscular.

The 1992 Ms. International is also famous for an incident involving British competitor Paula Bircumshaw.  Bircumshaw was the same height as Schreiner and possessed a similar level of symmetry and definition, but carried significantly more muscle, weighing in at 162 pounds.  She was the clear audience favorite, but was relegated to eighth place.  Normally, the top ten contestants are called out at the end of the show when the winners are announced, but the judges only called back the top six, hoping to keep Bircumshaw back stage.  This resulted in an uproar from the crowd.  With the audience chanting her name, Bircumshaw returned to the stage along with the top six competitors.

Advertising in Muscle & Fitness for the 1992 Ms. Olympia featured Schreiner prominently, relegating two-time defending champion Murray to a small "also competing" notice.  Nevertheless, Murray also apparently met the "femininity" requirements, and managed to retain her title; Schreiner finished sixth, and promptly retired from competition.

Following the 1992 debacles, the judging rules were rewritten.  The new rules retained provisions for aesthetics, but allowed the contests to be judged as physique contests.  Lenda Murray continued to dominate the sport from 1990 to 1995, matching Cory Everson's record of six consecutive Ms. Olympia titles.  Murray's closest rival was probably Laura Creavalle, who won the Ms. International title three times, and twice was runner-up to Murray at the Olympia.  During this time, some additional professional shows were held, in addition to the three mainstays.  The 1994 schedule included the Canada Pro Cup, won by Laura Binetti, and the first of three annual Grand Prix events in Prague, won by Drorit Kernes.  In 1996, the Grand Prix in Slovakia was added.  Besides providing the competitors with extra opportunities to win prize money, these contests also served as additional Ms. Olympia qualifiers.

The mid-1990s of bodybuilding was known as the "Dorian Era", AKA the "drug years". In 1996, Kim Chizevsky-Nicholls would win the Ms. Intentional and dethroned the Ms. International champion, Laura Creavalle. Also in 1996, she would unseat six-time defending champion, Lenda Murray. This was the first time a pro female bodybuilder would win both the Ms. International and Ms. Olympia in the same year. She would retain her Ms. Olympia title in 1997 against Lenda Murray, who retired afterwards. At the 1997 Ms. In 1998, she again won the Ms. Olympia title. The 1998 contest was held in Prague, Czech Republic, the first time the competition had been held outside the United States.

At the 1998 EFBB British Championships, Joanna Thomas won the lightweight and overall title, becoming the youngest woman in the world to ever to win an IFBB pro card at the age of 21.

The 1999 Ms. Olympia was originally scheduled to be held on October 9 in Santa Monica, California.  However, one month before the scheduled date, the IFBB announced that the contest had been cancelled.  The main cause was the withdrawal of promoter Jarka Kastnerova (who promoted the 1998 contest in Prague) for financial reasons, including a low number of advance ticket sales for the 1999 event.  The backlash following the announcement led to a flurry of activity, with the contest being rescheduled as part of the Women's Extravaganza (promoted by Kenny Kassel and Bob Bonham) in Secaucus, New Jersey on October 2.  Last minute sponsorship came from several sources, most significantly in the form of $50,000 from Flex magazine.  Amid all the turmoil, Kim Chizevsky-Nicholls won her fourth consecutive title. Chizevsky-Nicholls decided to retire from bodybuilding after winning the 1999 Ms. Olympia. According to Bill Dobbins, she retired due to gender discrimination guidelines set up by the IFBB that advocated for more "femininity" and less "muscularity" in the sport.

2000–2010

The IFBB introduced several changes to Ms. Olympia in 2000. The first change was that Ms. Olympia contest would no longer be held as a separate contest, instead became part of the "Olympia Weekend" in Las Vegas and held the day before the men's show. The second change was when heavyweight and lightweight classes where added. The third change was the new judging guidelines for presentations were introduced. A letter to the competitors from Jim Manion (chairman of the Professional Judges Committee) stated that women would be judged on healthy appearance, face, makeup, and skin tone. The criteria given in Manion's letter included the statement "symmetry, presentation, separations, and muscularity BUT NOT TO THE EXTREME!"

Of the three pro contests held in 2000, only the Ms. International named an overall winner - Vickie Gates, who had won the contest in 1999. The Jan Tana Classic and the Ms. Olympia simply had weight class winners. With Kim Chizevsky-Nicholls retiring from bodybuilding to pursue fitness competition, the Ms. Olympia title was shared by class winners Andrulla Blanchette and Valentina Chepiga.

The 2001 pro schedule opened routinely enough, with Vickie Gates winning the Ms. International title for the third consecutive year. However, the Ms. Olympia featured a "surprise" winner, as Juliette Bergmann returned to competition at age 42. Bergmann, the 1986 Pro World champion, had not competed since 1989.  Entering the Olympia as a lightweight, she defeated heavyweight winner Iris Kyle for the overall title.  In the five years that the Ms. Olympia was contested in multiple weight classes, this was the only time that the lightweight winner took the overall title.

In 2002, six-time Olympia winner Lenda Murray returned after a five-year absence. Bergmann (lightweight) and Murray (heavyweight) won the two weight classes in both 2002 and 2003. Murray won the overall title both years, setting a new standard of eight Ms. Olympia titles.

Murray was unseated as Ms. Olympia for the second time in 2004. Iris Kyle, a top pro competitor since 1999, defeated Murray in a close battle in the heavyweight class, and bested lightweight winner Dayana Cadeau for the overall title. Kyle became only the second woman to win both the Ms. International and Ms. Olympia titles in the same year, matching Kim Chizevsky-Nicholls's feat of 1996.

On 6 December 2004, IFBB Professional Division Vice Chairman Jim Manion issued a memo introducing the so-called '20 percent rule' to all IFBB professional female athletes. It read, “For aesthetics and health reasons, the IFBB Professional Division requests that female athletes in Bodybuilding, Fitness and Figure decrease the amount of muscularity by a factor of 20%. This request for a 20% decrease in the amount of muscularity applies to those female athletes whose physiques require the decrease regardless of whether they compete in Bodybuilding, Fitness or Figure. All professional judges have been advised of the proper criteria for assessing female physiques.” Needless to say the directive created quite a stir, and left many women wondering if they were one of “those female athletes whose physiques require the decrease”. On April 20, 2005, the IFBB adopted, by a 9 for, 1 against, and 3 no votes for Resolution 2005–0001, which announced that starting with the 2005 Ms. Olympia that the IFBB was abolishing the weight class system adopted in 2000.

The 2005 contest season saw another double winner, as Yaxeni Oriquen-Garcia won her third Ms. International title, then edged out defending champion Iris Kyle to win the Ms. Olympia. Also notable in 2005 was the return of Jitka Harazimova, who had last competed in 1999. Harazimova won the Charlotte Pro contest in her return to competition, qualifying her for the Ms. Olympia where she finished fourth. Also in 2005 the documentary Supersize She was released. The documentary focused on focused on British professional female bodybuilder Joanna Thomas and her competing at the 2004 GNC Show of Strength and the 2004 Ms. Olympia.

In 2006, Iris Kyle won both the Ms. International and the Ms. Olympia, repeating her accomplishment of 2004. Iris won the Ms. International and Ms. Olympia for a third time in 2007. Also in 2007 saw the brief revival of the Jan Tana Classic, which featured two weight classes for the female competitors.  The class titles were won by Stephanie Kessler (heavyweight) and Sarah Dunlap (lightweight), with Dunlap named the overall winner.

There was a bit of a controversy in the 2008 Ms. International. Iris Kyle was placed 7th due to "bumps" on her glutes, which according to head IFBB judge, Sandy Ranalli, was “distortions in her physique.” Yaxeni Oriquen-Garcia went on to win the 2008 Ms. Olympia. Iris made up for this by winning the 2008 Ms. Olympia.

2010–2014

Iris Kyle continued her success by winning both the Ms International and the Ms. Olympia in 2009, 2010, and 2011. In 2012, Iris suffered an injury to her leg and thus couldn't attend the 2012 Ms. International. Yaxeni Oriquen-Garcia won the 2012 Ms. International. Iris went on to win the 2012 Ms. Olympia and winning her seventh consecutive Olympia win and surpassing Lenda Murry's and  She went on to retake the 2013 Ms. International after not being able to attend the 2012 Ms. International due to leg injury. At the 2013 Ms. Olympia, Iris won her ninth overall Olympia win, thus giving her more overall Olympia titles than any other bodybuilder, male or female.

In 2012, Venezuelan Adriana Martin won the National Physique Committee's South Florida Bikini Championship in the over-30 category. At the time, the bikini division was a new element of the competition.

On June 7, 2013, event promoter of the Arnold Sports Festival, Jim Lorimer, announced that in 2014, the Arnold Classic 212 professional men's bodybuilding division would replace the Ms. International women's bodybuilding competition at the 2014 Arnold Sports Festival. Lorimer, in a statement, said “The Arnold Sports Festival was proud to support women's bodybuilding through the Ms. International for the past quarter century, but in keeping with demands of our fans, the time has come to introduce the Arnold Classic 212 beginning in 2014. We are excited to create a professional competitive platform for some of the IFBB Pro League's most popular competitors.”

At the 2014  Ms. Olympia, Iris Kyle won her tenth overall Olympia win, beating her own previous record of nine overall Olympia wins. She also won her ninth consecutive Olympia title in a row, beating Lee Haney's and Ronnie Coleman's record eight consecutive Olympia titles in a row, thus giving her more overall and consecutive Olympia wins than any other bodybuilder, male or female, of all time. After winning she announced that she will be retiring from bodybuilding. The 2014 Ms. Olympia was the last Ms. Olympia competition held until that competition's relaunch in 2020.

2015–present

On March 8, 2015, Wings of Strength announced the creation of the Wings of Strength Rising Phoenix World Championships. Regarded as the successor to the Ms. Olympia, Wings of Strength Rising Phoenix World Championships adopted the point qualification system that the Ms Olympia had. On August 22, 2015, Margie Martin won the title and best poser award for the first 2015 Wings of Strength Rising Phoenix World Championships.

Ms. Olympia relaunched in 2020, and Andrea Shaw won Ms. Olympia that year.
 		 	
Also in 2020, the American bodybuilder Jen Pasky Jaquin received the first IFBB pro card for female wheelchair bodybuilding.

IFBB Hall of Fame
The IFBB established a Hall of Fame in 1999.  The following women have been inducted:
 1999 – Carla Dunlap, Cory Everson, and Rachel McLish
 2000 – Bev Francis, Lisa Lyon, and Abbye Stockton
 2001 – Kay Baxter, Diana Dennis, and Kike Elomaa
 2002 – Laura Combes
 2003 – Lynn Conkwright
 2004 – Ellen van Maris
 2005 – Stacey Bentley
 2006 – Claudia Wilbourn
 2007 – Laura Creavalle
 2008 – Kim Chizevsky-Nicholls
 2009 – Juliette Bergmann
 2010 – Lenda Murray and Vickie Gates
 2011 – Tonya Knight and Anja Langer

Competitions

Professional competitions

2023 IFBB Pro League Schedule

Qualifications for IFBB professional card
In order to become an "IFBB Pro" you must first earn your IFBB Pro Card. In order to win a bodybuilder looking to do this must first win a regional contest weight class. When a bodybuilder wins or places highly they earn an invite to compete at their country's National Championships contest for that year. The winners of each weight class at the National Championships will then go head to head in a separate contest to see who is the overall Champion for the year. Depending on the federation, the overall Champion will be offered a pro card. Some federations offer Pro Cards to winners of individual weight class champions. This can mean that each year more than one bodybuilder may earn a Pro Card.

In the United States, the NPC (National Physique Committee) is affiliated with the IFBB and awards IFBB Pro Cards. The following competitions award IFBB Pro Cards:

NPC Women's National Championships has three weight classes: Lightweight, middleweight, and heavyweight. All three class winners in the contest are eligible for professional status.
NPC USA Championships has three weight classes. The overall winner is eligible for professional status.
IFBB World Championships, each weight class winner is eligible for pro status.
IFBB North American Championships, the overall winners is eligible for professional status.

Amateur competitions

2022 Pro Card Winners

National Physique Committee (NPC) competitions

National level competitions

Qualifications for national level competitions
In order to qualify for national level competitions a competitor must place in one of the following:
Rank in the top three in their weight class of the Women's open division in a contest that has been sanctioned as a national qualifier.
First overall in an area championship of the open division.
Top two in a weight class from an area level national qualifier
Overall winner in a district level competition designated as a national qualifier.
Winner of the weight class in a regional competition designated as a national qualifier.
Weight class winners from the Armed Forces.

Qualifications for Junior USA, Teen and Masters Nationals
To qualify for Junior USA, Teen or Masters Nationals a competitor must place in one of the following:
Top five in a weight class from a national level competition
Top three in a weight class in the Teen or Masters Nationals
Class winner in the Armed Forces
Top three in a weight class from an Area national qualifier
Top two from a district level national qualifier

Qualifications for USA and Junior Nationals
In order to qualify for USA and Junior Nationals a competitor must place in one of the following:
Top five in a weight class from the Nationals, USA, Team Universe or Junior Nationals
Top three in a weight class from the Teen, Collegiate Masters Nationals
Class winner in the Armed Forces
First overall in an area level national qualifier
Top two in an area level national qualifier
Weight class winner from a district level competition designated as a national qualifier

Qualifications for Nationals and North American Championships
In order to qualify for Nationals or North American Championships a competitor must place in one of the following:
Top five in a weight class from the Nationals, NPC USA or North American Championships
Top five in a weight class from the Team Universe, Junior Nationals or Junior USA
Top five in a weight class from  Teen Collegiate Masters Nationals
Top two in a weight class in the Armed Forces
Top two in a weight class in an area level national qualifier
Overall winner in a district level competition designated as a national qualifier
Class winners at the US and Nationals will be given five years of eligibility.

National Amateur Body-Builders' Association (NABBA) competitions

NABBA European Championships
NABBA Universe

World Fitness Federation competitions

Natural bodybuilding competitions

National Gym Association competitions

Fitness and figure competition

There are two other categories of competition that are closely related to bodybuilding, and are frequently held as part of the same event.  Fitness competition has a swimsuit round, and a round that is judged on the performance of a routine including aerobics, dance, or gymnastics.  Figure competition is a newer format, which combines female bodybuilding and gymnastics altogether, is judged solely on symmetry and muscle tone, with much less emphasis on muscle size than in bodybuilding.

In a competition, each woman poses in a bikini.  She must strike different poses, while facing forward, to the side, and to the rear.  During her poses, she must emphasize her arms, shoulders, chest, stomach, buttocks, and legs by flexing them.  The judges carefully observe, evaluate, then numerically grade the firmness and shapeliness of the woman's physique.

In the figure division the same judging criteria is applied, but without a fitness routine.

Sexism and discrimination

Misogynistic attitudes towards female bodybuilding have existed ever since the creation of the sport, as the body type female bodybuilders possess is highly different from the beauty standard of a skinny and delicate woman. In Studies in Popular Culture A.J. Randall et  al. describe this as the result of a patriarchal society which emphasizes that femininity is created by altering one's body to cater to society's gendered expectations When women venture away from gender expectations, society's view of their femininity begins to diminish. Female Bodybuilders experience this criticism of their body, as they build bodies which are commonly associated with the masculine identity.  Despite this there is a very dedicated female bodybuilding fan base.

The International Federation of Bodybuilding & Fitness has made several rules changes on the sport of female bodybuilding that relate to expected feminine identity. In 1992, the IFBB, attempted to "feminize" the sport by making the judges deduct points from competitors who were "too big," meaning too muscular. The IFBB then made a rule change in 2000 that emphasized a need for the women to decrease muscularity once again. Before Ms. International in 2005 the IFBB created another rule that required the women competing to decrease their own muscle mass by 20 percent to compete. Yet the men's bodybuilding rules have not changed in the same time period. In Qualitative Research in Sport and Exercise Chris Shilling and Tanya Bunsell state that all of these rule changes reflect the IFBB's attempts to make women more closely fit gender expectations, as they all emphasize the need for the female bodybuilders to become less massive. Bunsell and Shilling further state that male bodybuilding hasn't changed because their bodies are seen as masculine in identity, while female bodybuilding rules inhibit females from reaching the same muscularity.

In the documentary film Generation Iron 2, Iris Kyle, who stated she wanted to compete at the 2016 Wings of Strength Rising Phoenix World Championships, received an email from a show promoter that she had to requalify to attend. Under the Ms. Olympia rules, former Ms. Olympia champions were qualified for life. She stated she had been to do some work with them that she doesn't "agree with", but declined the offer. When asked to clarify, she stated that "sex sells" and that female bodybuilders sometimes sell muscle worship. While she was later allowed a special invite to the 2016 Wings of Strength Rising Phoenix World Championships, she declined to attend, instead focusing on training her boyfriend, Hidetada Yamagishi, for the 2017 Arnold Classic Men's Physique and focusing on their business venture.

Government bans
 Afghanistan – Women's bodybuilding is forbidden.
 Iran – On January 18, 2017, an Iranian female bodybuilder was arrested for "nudity" after she posted selfies of her flexing sleeveless on social media. "Nude", in this context refers to women not wearing a headscarf, or revealing body parts like arms and legs.

Performance-enhancing drugs (PEDs)

According to an Iron Man article, published on 1 May 2003 by Greg Zulak, who cites Dan Duchaine, author of the book Underground Steroid Handbook and worked with countless world-class female bodybuilders, listed the following performance-enhancing drugs that female bodybuilders may use:

Oxymetholone (Anadrol)
Oxandrolone (Anavar)
Clenbuterol
Nandrolone decanoate (Deca-Durabolin)
Methandrostenolone (Dianabol)
Boldenone (Equipose)
Fluoxymesterone (Halotestin)
Human growth hormone
Ethylestrenol (Maxibolan)
Tamoxifen (Novaldex)
Methenolone (Primabolan)
Trenbolone
Stanozolol (Winstrol)
Testosterone

Policies

In 2001, Katie Arnoldi, a former bodybuilder who wrote the book Chemical Pink about her bodybuilding career, said industry insiders know what goes on, but the sport is reluctant to test bodybuilders more strictly for steroids because big physiques draw big profits. In the 2005 television documentary Supersize She, when Joanna Thomas was asked about steroid usage she said sarcastically "Yeah it's all about the steroids, you know. We just take steroids and look like this. Try this at home everyone, for a few weeks, and see how you look." She also said "Take what you like. A lot of people would not look like me. It's all of my life since I was 15 years old, dedication to this sport. It's not just about what people take. It's this." as she pointed to her brain.

Policies of the International Federation of BodyBuilding and Fitness (IFBB)

According to the 2008 MSNBC documentary Hooked: Muscle Women, the IFBB does not routinely drug test athletes who compete in the federation. Also in the documentary, Kristy Hawkins said she thought steroids were "prevalent in every sport but with us it's just more obvious."

Policies of the IFBB Pro League and the National Physique Committee (NPC)

In 2001, Sandy Ranalli of the NPC said drug testing can just be too expensive. "To be honest with you, we're such a small sport, it's just not financially feasible," says Ranalli of drug testing the athletes. She said, however, they try to do random testing occasionally. Ranalli also said that: "There's steroids in every sport … But to say you're not going to get to the competitive level … without steroids, that itself is false."

Mitigation efforts
Bodybuilding causes increased lean body mass and decreased body fat, which causes breast tissue reduction in female athletes  whereas the current trend regarding the judges' search for "feminine" physique at competitions makes compensative breast augmentation with breast implants an increasingly popular procedure among female bodybuilders. It is estimated that 80% of professional female bodybuilders get breast implants so they can maintain upper to lower body symmetry.

Surveys and studies on side effects
A 1985 interview of ten weight-trained women athletes who consistently used anabolic steroids were interviewed about their patterns of drug use and the perceived effects. Anabolic steroids were used in a cyclical manner, often with several drugs taken simultaneously. All participants believed that muscle size and strength were increased in association with anabolic steroid use. Most also noted a deepening of the voice, increased facial hair, increased aggressiveness, clitoral enlargement, and menstrual irregularities. The participants were willing to tolerate these side effects but thought that such changes might be unacceptable to many women.
A 1989 study of competitive female bodybuilders from Kansas and Missouri found that 10% use steroids on a regular basis. The female bodybuilders reported that they had used an average of two different steroids including nandrolone, oxandrolone, testosterone, metandienone, boldenone, and stanozolol.
A 1991 study of nine female weight-lifters using steroids and seven not using these agents has found that it appears that the self-administration of testosterone and anabolic steroids is increasingly practiced by women in sports where strength and endurance are important. Of the nine anabolic steroid users, seven took multiple anabolic steroids simultaneously. Thirty-fold elevations of serum testosterone were noted in the women injecting testosterone. In three of these women serum testosterone levels exceeded the upper limits for normal male testosterone concentrations. A significant compensatory decrease in sex hormone-binding globulin and a decrease in thyroid-binding proteins were noted in the women steroid users. Also, a 39% decrease in high-density lipoprotein cholesterol was noted in the steroid-using weight lifters. Most of the subjects in this study used anabolic steroids continuously, which raises concern about premature atherosclerosis and other disease processes developing in these women.
A 2000 survey found that one-third of the female bodybuilders reported past or current steroid use and almost half of those who were non-steroid users admitted use of performance-enhancing drugs such as ephedrine. The study investigators found that women who used steroids were more muscular than their non-steroid-using counterparts and were also more likely to use other performance-enhancing substances. Despite its popularity among female bodybuilding, usage of steroids among female bodybuilders, unlike male bodybuilding, is a taboo subject and rarely admitted use among female bodybuilders. Although the IFBB officially bans the usage of performance-enhancing drugs, it does not test athletes rigorously.
A 2009 survey of both men and women found that while men overall use anabolic–androgenic steroids, more women than men who use anabolic–androgenic steroids were competitive bodybuilders or weightlifters, with only 33.3% describing themselves as "recreational lifters" with no interest in competition. The survey found that 75% of the women experienced clitoral enlargement, half had irregular periods and showed changes in their voices. Despite this 90% said they would continue to use steroids.

Cultural references

See also

References

Further reading

"Rewind: review of February issues from five, 10 and 15 years ago", Flex, February 2003
Levin, Dan, "Here She Is, Miss, Well, What?", Sports Illustrated, March 17, 1980
Merritt, Greg, "15 Biggest Controversies and Shocking Moments in Bodybuilding History", Flex, February 2006
Roark, Joe, "Featuring 2005 Hall of Fame Inductee: Stacey Bentley", Flex, August 2005
Todd, Jan, "Bodybuilding", St. James Encyclopedia of Pop Culture, Gale Group, 1999
Women's Physique Publication, published from December 1976 through 1991 (also appeared under the names WASP and WSP)
Women's Physique World, published two to six times per year since 1984

External links

OIFBB Professional League
Canadian Bodybuilding Federation

 
Sports originating in the United States